Glyptonotus is a genus of marine isopod crustaceans. There are two recognized species:

References

Valvifera
Isopod genera